St. Blaise is a school founded in 1879 and is run by the Roman Catholic parish of St. Blaise, Amboli in the Indian state of Maharashtra. The Secondary school is recognized  by the Government of  Maharashtra and  the Primary school is recognized by the Municipal Corporation of Greater Mumbai. The School prepares students of Standard ten for the Secondary School Leaving Certificate examinations conducted by the Maharashtra State Board of Secondary and Higher Secondary Education. Students are also  prepared for Governmental Drawing Examinations, Hindi and Marathi Public Examinations.

Campus
The campus of the school is around 400 meters long. It has a hockey ground and a football ground with a stage for celebrating the school's Annual Day, as well as a small canteen. St. Blaise Church stands next to the school.

Diamond jubilee
St. Blaise High School celebrated its diamond jubilee in 1954.

Uniform
 Boys - Mild olive green pants (with side pockets) and white shirts, batch on the shirt, black leather shoes and white socks.
 Girls - Checked pinafore with white blouse, batch on the pinafore and black leather buckled shoes and white socks. Pinafore two inches below the knees bloomers or cycle shorts to be worn.
 Footwear - During rainy season black color sandals are allowed. No floaters, no chappals and no colored sandals.

Former Principals
 1950–1957 - Rev. Winnibold Menezes
 1957–1974 - Rev. Santan F Dharmai
 1974–1976 - Rev. Joe Pereira
 1976–1985 - Rev. Brian Fernandes
 1985–1991 - Rev. Lucian Fernandes
 1991–1998 - Rev. Andrew Mukadom
 1998–2000 - Rev. John Lopes
 2000–2005 - Rev. James D'Silva
 2005–2006 - Rev. Leslie Almeida
 2006–2017 - Sr. Mary K. Sab
 2017–present - Sr. Bindu Joseph

School Activities

The house system
The students are divided into Four Houses and all activities are conducted by House. Prefects are chosen from the topmost classes to help maintain discipline. The prefects meet once a month.
 Sarojini house - Yellow
 Nehru house - Red
 Gandhi house - Green
 Tagore house - Blue

Competitions
Elocution in English, Hindi, Marathi, Dramatics, Singing, Debating, Arts and Crafts, Handwriting, General Knowledge, Rangoli and Dance.

Games
Sports and games offered at the school include football, cricket, hockey, volleyball, throw ball, table tennis, boxing, wrestling, carrom, and chess.

Activities
Scouting, Guiding and Social Service Each student from Std. VIII to X must take part in one of these activities. The School provides a Library and a reading room.

Tours
Excursion Leadership Camps are organized from time to time.

References

External links
School website 

Catholic secondary schools in India
Primary schools in India
Christian schools in Maharashtra
High schools and secondary schools in Mumbai
Educational institutions established in 1879
1879 establishments in India